New Times Broward-Palm Beach is a news website that until 2016 also published a weekly print newspaper; it is part of the Voice Media Group chain. The original paper split off from the Miami New Times in 1997, under the auspices of then editor-in-chief Tom Walsh. Walsh was succeeded by Chuck Strouse, who was replaced in 2005 with Tony Ortega. In March 2007, Ortega was appointed as editor-in-chief of the company's flagship paper, The Village Voice. In April 2007, Robert Meyerowitz was named editor-in-chief, though he departed the following May to take an endowed chair at University of Alaska. In 2009, Eric Barton was hired as editor; in June 2012, he left the company when editorship of the paper was combined with that of Miami New Times, where Strouse became editor. Tom Finkel is currently the editor of both papers. In September 2012, Village Voice Media executives Scott Tobias, Christine Brennan and Jeff Mars bought Village Voice Media's papers and associated web properties from its founders and formed Voice Media Group.

Although it began as a print publication, New Times went on to pioneer digital journalism in South Florida, turning veteran reporter Bob Norman's "Daily Pulp" news blog into the region's first truly popular news site. Norman now works as an investigative reporter for WPLG-TV-Channel 10. In 2014, parent company Voice Media Group consolidated its South Florida newsrooms within the Miami New Times office. New Times ceased print publication in 2016; it now operates as a web-only publication.

Awards
New Times' reporters have won hundreds of journalism prizes, including the Livingston Award for Young Journalists, the Sigma Delta Chi Award, the Gerald Loeb Award, Investigative Reporter & Editor (IRE) honors, and numerous Association of Alternative Newsmedia Awards.

References

External links
 

Newspapers published in Florida
Alternative weekly newspapers published in the United States
Publications established in 1997
1997 establishments in Florida